The following is a list of Wildstorm reprint collections, detailing collected works of Wildstorm comic books.

Wildstorm Universe

Homage

Wildstorm Signature Series

America's Best Comics (ABC)